Karin Grech Garden (Maltese: Ġnien Karin Grech), officially Karin Grech Playing Field, is a public garden and playing field in San Ġwann, Malta. The garden is named after Karin Grech, a letterbomb victim.

Location
Karin Grech Garden is located at Vjal Ir-Rihan (Rihan Road), at the front of San Ġwann Parish Church dedicated to Our Lady of Lourdes.

History

Before the creation of the garden the site consisted of natural fauna and flora, used as agricultural land from the times of the Romans until the middle of the 20th century, and since then rehabilitated as a public garden. Before, during and mainly after the Second World War several Maltese and British families flocked out of Valletta, the Three Cities of Cottonera and the surrounding suburbs and moved to San Gwann as a general consequence of the war; they moved out initially to avoid the bombardment targeting the Grand Harbour area. 

With the growing population in San Ġwann, Maltese politicians and the community have pushed for a public garden to provide a recreational area. The garden was for many years the only urban public garden in San Ġwann, with other gardens having been created over time. The garden was built in the memory of Karin Maria Grech in 1981.

In March 2020, the playing field was damaged due to a car chase crash on site.

Naming of the garden

The garden was initially referred to simply as il-gnien (the garden) for some time, before being named the Karin Grech Playing Field (Ġnien Karin Grech). The garden was named after Karin Maria Grech, a victim of a letter bomb attack. The main feature of the garden is the monument of Karin Grech that is a commemoration monument of her being a victim in a political crisis concerning her father Edwin Grech, an obstetrician and gynaecologist at the time of the 1977 doctors' strike

A yearly event takes place in December, were flowers are laid at the monument.

Plaques and Monuments

Official opening plaque 

On the plaque commemorating the official opening is written:

The monument 

On the Karin Maria Grech Monument is written:

Modernization of the playing field 

Karin Grech Playing field underwent some refurbishment to modernise the playing facilities. On the re-opening of the playing a plaque was uncovered saying:

Freedom Day Monument 

Another monument at the garden commemorates Freedom day of 1979. On the plaque is written:

Architecture

The present design of the garden is a modest design. The playing field was last refurbished by the San Ġwann Local Council who took care to adapt it with contextual modernisation.

See also
 San Ġwann
 Tal-Mensija Cart Tracks - pre-historic cart ruts
 Ta' Ċieda Tower - Punic-Roman tower
 Ta' Xindi Farmhouse - Medieval farmhouse
 Castello Lanzun - Order of St. John
 Santa Margerita Chapel - Medieval Chapel
 Kolonna Eterna - Decorative garden monument

References

San Ġwann
Gardens in Malta